This is a list of prefects of Koprivnica-Križevci County.

Prefects of Koprivnica-Križevci County (1993–present)

See also
Koprivnica-Križevci County

Notes

External links
World Statesmen - Koprivnica-Križevci County

Koprivnica-Križevci County